Curteni may refer to several villages in Romania:

 Curteni, a village in Sântana de Mureș Commune, Mureș County
 Curteni, a village in Oltenești Commune, Vaslui County